In pharmacology, a GABA transaminase inhibitor is an enzyme inhibitor that acts upon GABA transaminase.
Inhibition of GABA transaminase enzymes reduces the degradation of GABA, leading to increased neuronal GABA concentrations.

Examples include valproic acid, vigabatrin, phenylethylidenehydrazine (and drugs that metabolize to it, such as phenelzine), ethanolamine-O-sulfate (EOS), and L-cycloserine.

Certain members of this class are used as anticonvulsants.

References